Cyberstalker (a.k.a. Offline) is a 2012 Lifetime television  thriller directed by Curtis Crawford and starring Mischa Barton. Barton stars as a young artist living in seclusion since her parents were murdered by her stalker thirteen years earlier; her peace is suddenly disturbed by his reappearance. On 10 July 2012, a trailer was released. It was televised in the United States on 14 September 2012.

Plot

Aiden Ashley's family life had been torn apart thirteen years earlier, when an online stalker tracked her down to her home and murdered both of her parents in an avalanche of terror. Her stalker fled the crime scene without ever revealing his face to Aiden.

As a precaution, Aiden shuns the Internet for the next thirteen years, intending to stay off-line, attending therapy sessions and living in seclusion. She breaks this seclusion after her friend and art dealer, Winton Cornelis, convinces her to hold a public art gala, showcasing her own work. The gala marks a dramatic turn in her personal life, after she becomes romantically involved with a guest, Paul Rogers.

Meanwhile, Detective James Page continues to investigate on the unsolved case of Aiden's parents' murder and recent cyber-stalking. Page hires Jack Dayton, a cyber-security whiz, to research Aiden's life. Dayton makes the shocking discovery that Aiden's stalker is still at large. Aiden's stalker follows her undetected, and installs secret cameras in her home.

Suspicion turns to Aiden's art dealer, with the discovery of suspicious financial transactions between his and Aiden's bank accounts. Things do not also appear to be as good as they seem, as Aiden's love interest, Paul's troubled past is revealed. Furthermore, Detective Page's involvement is curious, as he is the only one meticulously following a cold case after thirteen years. As time goes on, Aiden's stalker becomes ever more desperate to be a part of her life, but Aiden is determined not to let this person blow her life apart once more. Jack Dayton is revealed to be the cyber-stalker and killer of Aiden's parents, and the stalker is shot dead by Detective Page.

Cast

Production
Filming on the project began on 15 June 2011 in Ottawa, Ontario, Canada and was completed in three weeks.

References

External links
 

2012 television films
2012 films
Canadian thriller television films
English-language Canadian films
Films shot in Ottawa
Lifetime (TV network) films
American thriller television films
2010s English-language films
2010s American films
2010s Canadian films